is a South African born, Australian raised, Japanese rugby union player who plays as a centre. He currently plays for Panasonic Wild Knights in Japan's domestic Top League. He received Japanese citizenship in 2019.

International
After 3 Top League seasons for Panasonic Wild Knights, Dylan Riley received his first call-up to his adopted country, Japan head coach Jamie Joseph has named Dylan Riley in a 52-man training squad ahead of British and Irish Lions test.

Honours

Saitama Wild Knights
League One – D1
Winner: 2022
Top League
Winner: 2021

References

External links

1997 births
Living people
Japanese rugby union players
Australian rugby union players
Rugby union centres
Saitama Wild Knights players
Australian expatriates in Japan
Brisbane City (rugby union) players
Rugby union wings
Japan international rugby union players